Hooper is an unincorporated community in Haralson County, in the U.S. state of Georgia.

History
A post office called Hooper was established in 1881, and remained in operation until 1903. The community was named after Joseph M. Hooper, proprietor of several local mills.

References

Unincorporated communities in Haralson County, Georgia